Oakwood Cemetery is a historic cemetery in the city of Fort Worth, Texas. Deeded to the city in 1879, it is the burial place of local prominent local citizens, pioneers, politicians, and performers.

Located at 701 Grand Avenue, Oakwood is a 62-acre cemetery on the north side of the Trinity River, just across the river from downtown Fort Worth.

The cemetery is actually composed of three historically distinct cemeteries divided along racial and religious lines: New City Cemetery, the oldest section historically limited to white burials; Trinity Cemetery, designated for African-American burials; and Calvary Cemetery, a section specifically for Catholic burials.

The cemetery was designated a historic district on the National Register of Historic Places in 2018 and a Recorded Texas Historic Landmark in 1966. One grave site within the cemetery is also designated separately as a Recorded Texas Historic Landmark since 1983.

History

The original 20 acres that form the City Cemetery were deeded to the City of Fort Worth by local civic leader John Peter Smith in 1879, after the city's oldest cemetery, Pioneers Rest, had rapidly filled. In 1880, a section of the property was partitioned off and limited to Catholic burials at the request of Bishop C.W. Dubois of Galveston. This new Catholic section was named Calvary Cemetery.

The Oakwood Cemetery Association formed in 1908 and a chapel was built on the north end of the property in 1912. In 1926 a new Oakwood Cemetery Association charter was instated requiring a five-member board of directors. The president of the Fort Worth National Bank, the institution that held the association's funds in trust, was required to be a director; of the remaining four members, two had to be women. Among the first board members were Jennie Scott Scheuber, a local civic leader and the city's first librarian, and Major K.M. Van Zandt, longtime president of the Fort Worth National Bank. In 1952, the charter was amended to allow board representation from any bank in Fort Worth with oversight of the association's endowment.

Notable graves and monuments

Oakwood Cemetery is home to Bartenders' Row, a section of graves belonging to bartenders from Fort Worth's notorious Hell's Half Acre, and Bricklayers' Row, a section formerly reserved for members of the local bricklayers' union. In 1903, Fort Worth mayor T.J. Powell designated a section of the cemetery, known as Soldiers' Row, for the burial of Confederate Civil War veterans and their wives.

Notable local individuals interred at Oakwood Cemetery include:
 Adrienne Ames (1907–1947), actress
 Charles Keith Bell  (1853–1913), member of the United States House of Representatives
 Euday Louis Bowman (1887–1949), musician and ragtime composer
 Samuel Burk Burnett (1849–1922), cattleman and owner of the 6666 Ranch
 Mary Couts Burnett (1856–1924), philanthropist and donor to Texas Christian University
 William Paxton Burts, first mayor of Fort Worth
 Horace J. Carswell, Jr. (1916–1944), U.S. Army major and namesake of the former Carswell Air Force Base
 Jim Courtwright (1848–1887), Fort Worth sheriff killed in gun battle with Luke Short
 Charles Allen Culberson (1855–1925), Texas governor and U.S. Senator
 Elisha Adam Euless (1848–1911), founder and namesake of the city of Euless, Texas
 Al Hayne (1850–1890), British civil engineer who perished rescuing women & children from the Texas Spring Palace fire
 Gladys McClure (1914–1933), actress and sister of Adrienne Ames
 William Madison "Gooseneck Bill" McDonald (1866–1950), African-American politician and businessman
 Jim Miller (1861–1909), outlaw and assassin
 Joe Pate (1892–1948), professional baseball player
 Jennie Scott Scheuber (1860–1944), notable librarian and civic leader
 Luke Short (1854–1893), cowboy, gunfighter, and saloon owner
 John Bunyan Slaughter (1848–1928), rancher
 John Peter Smith (1831–1901), civic leader and six-term mayor of Fort Worth and namesake of John Peter Smith Hospital
 Khleber Miller Van Zandt (1836–1930), businessman and politician
 Electra Waggoner (1882–1925), rancher, heiress, and socialite
 William Thomas Waggoner (1852–1934), rancher and oilman
 Thomas Neville Waul (1813–1903), Confederate Army brigadier general; the grave is designated Recorded Texas Historic Landmark #2142
In December 2017, the 1,100-year-old remains of a Native American woman found by construction workers digging a trench in downtown Fort Worth were buried at Oakwood Cemetery in accordance with NAGPRA requirements; burial rites were performed by local Native American spiritual leaders.

See also

 National Register of Historic Places listings in Tarrant County, Texas
 Recorded Texas Historic Landmarks in Tarrant County

References

External links
 
 

1879 establishments in Texas
Cemeteries in Fort Worth, Texas
Historic districts on the National Register of Historic Places in Texas
National Register of Historic Places in Fort Worth, Texas
Recorded Texas Historic Landmarks